Private Amédéo Garrammone, a military police officer of CFB Halifax, received the Cross of Valour, Canada's second highest award for bravery, for risking his life and being injured coming to the rescue of a man who was being attacked.

Private Garrammone’s citation reads:

References

Recipients of the Cross of Valour (Canada)
Living people
Year of birth missing (living people)